The 1964–65 Ohio Bobcats men's basketball team represented Ohio University as a member of the Mid-American Conference in the college basketball season of 1964–65. The team was coached by Jim Snyder and played their home games at Grover Center. The Bobcats finished the regular season with a record of 19–6 and won MAC regular season title with a conference record of 11–1. They received a bid to the NCAA tournament. There they lost to Dayton in the First Round.

Schedule

|-
!colspan=9 style=| Regular Season

|-
!colspan=9 style=| NCAA Tournament

Source:

Statistics

Team Statistics
Final 1964–65 Statistics

Source

Player statistics

Source

References

Ohio Bobcats men's basketball seasons
Ohio
Ohio
Ohio Bobcats men's basketball
Ohio Bobcats men's basketball